Steelheart is a 1921 American silent Western film directed by William Duncan and starring Duncan, Edith Johnson and Jack Curtis.

Cast
 William Duncan as Frank Worthing
 Edith Johnson as Ethel Kendall
 Jack Curtis as 'Butch' Dorgan
 Walter Rodgers as Steve
 Euna Luckey as Mrs Freeman
 Ardeta Malino as Vera
 Earl Crain as Dick Colter
 Charles Dudley as 'Old Tom' Shelley

References

Bibliography
 Langman, Larry. A Guide to Silent Westerns. Greenwood Publishing Group, 1992.

External links
 

1921 films
1921 Western (genre) films
American black-and-white films
Vitagraph Studios films
Films directed by William Duncan
Silent American Western (genre) films
1920s English-language films
1920s American films